Free Will is the fifth studio album by American rapper Freeway. The album was released on April 29, 2016, by Babygrande Records.

Track listing

References

2016 albums
Freeway (rapper) albums
Babygrande Records albums